The Semiconductor Industry Association (SIA) is a trade association and lobbying group founded in 1977 that represents the United States semiconductor industry. It is located in Washington, D.C.

One of the main achievements of the SIA was the creation of the first National Technology Roadmap for Semiconductors, in the early 1990s.

About
The Semiconductor Industry Association (SIA) positions itself as the voice of the U.S. semiconductor industry.  This is one of America's top export industries and a driver of American economic strength, national security and global competitiveness. Founded in 1977 by five microelectronics pioneers Wilfred Corrigan of Fairchild Semiconductor, Robert Noyce of Intel Corporation, Jerry Sanders of Advanced Micro Devices, Charles Sporck of National Semiconductor Corporation and John Welty of Motorola, SIA unites companies that account for 80 percent of America’s semiconductor production. Through this coalition, SIA seeks to strengthen US leadership of semiconductor design and manufacturing by working with Congress, the Administration and other key industry stakeholders to encourage policies and regulations that fuel innovation, propel business and drive international competition.

Goals
The SIA maintains that a robust semiconductor industry is the only way to ensure that America remains the global technology leader, and works towards this goal through outreach to members of Congress, their staff, executive branch officials, foreign governments, member companies and trade associations.

Semiconductors – microchips that control all modern electronics – have a major impact on modern life. They enable the technologies that people use to work, communicate, travel, entertain, harness energy, treat illness and make new scientific discoveries.
 
 The semiconductor industry directly employs a quarter of a million people in the U.S. and supports more than one million additional American jobs.
 In 2012, U.S. semiconductor companies generated $146 billion in sales and semiconductors make the global trillion dollar electronics industry possible.
 U.S. semiconductor companies represent over half the worldwide market.
 Semiconductors are one of America’s largest exports.

Stances of SIA

CHIPS for America Act
The SIA has lobbied strongly in favor of the bipartisan legislation known as CHIPS for America Act, which would invest a lot in the U.S. semiconductor industry for greater semiconductor supply chain independence from countries like South Korea, Taiwan and China.

Tariffs on China
The SIA in general has not been supportive of strong tariffs imposed on China (see China–United States trade war), as it negatively impacts the U.S. semiconductor industry which relies on a global supply chain. John Neuffer of SIA stated: "We have made the case to the [Trump] administration, in the strongest possible terms, that tariffs imposed on semiconductors imported from China will hurt America's chipmakers, not China's, and will do nothing to stop China's problematic and discriminatory trade practices".

See also
 SEMI

References

External links
 

Technology trade associations
Mass media companies